9 South African Infantry Battalion is a motorised infantry unit of the South African Army, designated seaborne.

History 
What was previously known as the South African Cape Corps (SACC) ( (SAKK)) was renamed the 9 South African Infantry Battalion (9 SAI) in 1992.

On 31 March 1992, all SACC units were disbanded. The next day 9 SAI was established in their place.

Deployments
9 SAI was deployed in Burundi in early 2006. Companies were deployed in different provinces and started projects such as upgrading hospitals, repainting school buildings, repairing the roofs, donating sports equipment to schools, sharing food with the local population and participating in different sports with the local population, the national police and the Burundi Defence Force.

Role
Amphibious motorised infantry.

Home base
Eerste River, Western Cape

Battle honours
 Cape of Good Hope
 Kilimanjaro
 Behobeho
 Nvangao
 East Africa 1916-7
 East Africa 1917-8
 Megiddo
 Nablus
 Palestine 1918

Leadership

Insignia

Previous Dress Insignia

Current Dress Insignia

Motto
 Fortiter et fideliter (Boldly and faithfully)
 Ebenhaeser (Thus far the Lord has led us)

See also

 Military history of South Africa
 South Africa Marine Corps

Notes

References

Infantry regiments of South Africa
Military units and formations in Cape Town